There are two rivers named the River Styx in the U.S. state of Michigan:

River Styx (Gratiot County, Michigan)
River Styx (Marquette County, Michigan)

Set index articles on rivers of Michigan